The Downtown Community Television Center or DCTV is a community media center located in the former Engine Company 31 firehouse in Manhattan's Civic Center on Lafayette Street. It was founded in 1972 by spouses documentary film director Jon Alpert and Keiko Tsuno.

Mission
According to their website, DCTV "introduc[es] members of the community to the basics of electronic media through hundreds of free or low-cost production courses and access to broadcast-quality production equipment."  DCTV conducts classes enabling people from less privileged backgrounds to learn to create video productions and operates studios available to them for low cost.  These programs are funded in part by earnings from DCTV's own documentary films which have won 16 national Emmy awards and many other honors.

Facilities
DCTV is based in Firehouse, Engine Company 31, a landmarked firehouse at 87 Lafayette Street in Manhattan, constructed in 1895 and purchased by DCTV in the 1980s.

Programs
Pro-TV (Professional Youth Media Training) is a program designed to train students from New York City's underprivileged communities in media arts, using state-of-the-art equipment.

Films
DCTV's productions Include:

 1980 – Third Avenue: Only the Strong Survive – Winner of the National Emmy, this milestone cinema verité documentary tells the stories of six "ordinary" people who live or work along New York City's Third Avenue, which runs for sixteen miles through Manhattan, Brooklyn, and the Bronx, cutting through the complex social strata of the city to reveal wildly different economic and ethnic subcultures.  The subjects speak for themselves, offering candid glimpses into the disparate worlds of a junkyard dealer who steals cars, a Bowery bum and the wife he abandoned, a welfare mother living in a burnt-out building with her five children, a male prostitute, a God-fearing Puerto Rican factory worker, and an aging Italian barber and his wife.  Calling it "a triumph of its kind and a guidepost to a new age of television," The Washington Post raved, "This program is essentially about whatever it is that makes people stand up and curse and dare anybody to trample them again."
 1983 – Invisible Citizens: Japanese Americans – In the first days of World War II, 120,000 Japanese-Americans were taken from their homes and locked in concentration camps for the duration of the war. It is the first in-depth look at a group of people whose pride has kept their pain and suffering concealed from the general public.  Invisible Citizens prompts viewers to consider America's "hidden histories" and how we, as a people, look at our past.
 1986 – Junkie Junior – A five-year portrait of Junior Rios' descent into the black hole of drug addiction which will ultimately cost him everything.
 1986 – The Philippines: Life, Death & Revolution – An in-depth look at the Philippines at the height of the turmoil leading up to and following President Ferdinand Marcos' departure from power. From the smoking garbage heaps of Manila to an armed rebel camp deep in the mountains, the Filipino people tell their story with dignity and passion.
 1987 – Hard Metals Disease – This Emmy Award winning documentary examines the "Hard Metals Disease" epidemic among workers at GTE's Valenite Corporation and raises questions about corporate responsibility.
 1987 – Hunger in the Suburbs – It seems hard to believe that in the world's most affluent country, where farmers are paid millions of dollars not to produce food, hunger is a growing epidemic. Foodbanks throughout the country continue to report a tremendous rise in the demand for their services. Hungry families struggle to feed themselves in their middle-class neighborhoods.  This documentary sheds light on what some hungry Americans are doing to feed themselves. Their ideas may inspire more communities to create innovative local solutions.
 1989 – One Year in a Life of Crime: Part I – One Year In a Life of Crime documents 12 months in the lives of Robert, Mike, and Freddy, three professional criminals from Newark, NJ, whose tangles with the law prompt viewers to consider the social issues which underlie criminality and reassess the remedies in which our society places its faith.
 1991 – Rape: Cries from the Heartland – Rape is the fastest-growing and most under-reported crime in America.  Every five minutes a woman is raped.  This video profiles seven victims whose ages range from eight to seventy-two, and includes interviews with rape crisis counselors, and with the police.  This film brutally portrays the physical and emotional trauma suffered by rape victims, who are often further victimized by the legal inability to bring their assailants to justice.  Filmed at the rape crisis center in Memphis, Tennessee, the program presents a disturbing portrait of rape as it really is — an act of violence, not sex.
1991 – The Story of Vinh – As many as 100,000 Amerasian children were left in Vietnam by their American Fathers when the U.S. troops pulled out in 1973.  In the years following the war, the United States allowed some Amerasians to migrate to the United States.  The Story of Vinh unflinchingly focuses on one such refugee from the streets of Saigon who arrives with no English Language skills and little tolerance for the American foster care system. The program shows our failure to integrate Vinh into the social fabric and forces us to examine the legacy of the Vietnam War, the limits of our societal obligations to refugees and their assimilation into American society.  It is also a story about transition – youth to manhood, Vietnamese to American, and dreams to reality.
 1994 – Chiapas:  The Fight for Land and Liberty – This collection of reports delves into the heart of Chiapas in the early months of the Zapatista uprising led by Subcomandante Marcos, the ski-masked leader of the movement.
 1994 – Snakeheads: The Chinese Mafia & The New Slave Trade – Every year millions of impoverished Chinese men and women risk their small fortunes and their lives to place themselves at the mercy of the Chinese Mafia in order to find work in the United States.  The squalid conditions under which they live once they arrive pose thoughtful questions about the economic forces and social policies working to create such conditions.  Despite the risks, there is an endless pool of Chinese who dream of making the voyage to the land they call The Golden Mountain.
 1995 – High on Crack Street: Lost Lives in Lowell – In blue-collar Lowell, Massachusetts, where disappearing industry has produced high unemployment, some residents have turned to crack for relief – only to see their dreams of a better life go up in smoke. High On Crack Street is a harrowing documentary chronicling 18 months in the lives of three crackhouse friends whose addiction has led them to crime and despair.
 1995 – Lock Up:  The Prisoners of Riker's Island – If you're arrested in New York City and you can't make bail... welcome to Riker's Island.  Most young men in New York City have a better chance of doing time in Riker's than of getting into college.  Each night they spend there will cost the taxpayer more than a night in the Waldorf Astoria.  An uncompromising picture of America's incarceration system, this gripping documentary will provoke serious discussion about our society's distribution of resources.  Is this vast penal institution the best solution to crime?
 1998 – Canal Street: First Stop In America – From the bustling underground world of counterfeit goods, street vendors, shantytowns and sweatshops, witness the struggle of hardworking people subject not only to the difficulties of their labor but to a street with a law of its own.
 1998 – A Cinderella Season: The Lady Vols Fight Back"A Cinderella Season, DCTV official website  – Winners of the 1996 NCAA Women's Basketball Championship, the University of Tennessee's Lady Volunteers seemed poised to contend for the trophy again. But halfway through the 1997 season, the team were not living up to their promise. They were losing almost every important game of the season. Injury to a star player, Kellie Jolly, didn't help. It seemed that even the remarkable efforts of Chamique Holdsclaw would not keep the team from falling apart. Could this team really win again?
 2001 – Campaign Confidential – Throughout July and August 2001, Jon Alpert and the DCTV and WNET staff spent many days on the campaign trail with each of the seven major party candidates who want to be the next Mayor of New York City.   The idea was to capture a "day in the life" of each of these men competing to be the person who is often considered the second most powerful man in the country.
 2001 – Papa – Jon Alpert's documentary portrait of his father's struggles with aging and failing health.
 2002 – Afghanistan: From Ground Zero to Ground Zero – The story of Masuda Sultan, a 23-year-old Afghan-American woman who travels back to Kandahar, Afghanistan after the WTC fell on September 11th, 2001.  Masuda is delighted to see the yoke of the Taliban lifted, but horrified to find that American bombs killed 19 members of her family.
 2003 – Bridge to Baghdad I – Filmed on March 1, 2003, just two weeks before the start of the Iraq War, the youth of New York City and the youth of Baghdad meet for an unprecedented conversation about the futures of the lands they will someday govern.
 2003 – Bridge to Baghdad II – Only days after the U.S. declared the war officially over, the American and Iraqi teens from Bridge to Baghdad I reunite to talk about what has happened and what is to come.
 2003 – Coca and the Congressman – In recent years Bolivia has been roiled by competing political forces, with the indigenous coca grower's union (the “Cocaleros”) becoming an unexpected powerhouse.  Their hero is ex-Congressman Evo Morales, a former coca farmer from indigenous peasant roots, who rose up last year to defend the coca growers against the Bolivian military's crop eradication program.  This prescient documentary predicted the ensuing resignation of the President, rise of the indigenous people and subsequent revolution.  Coca and the Congressman illuminates the shifting balance of power that's underway in Bolivia – and spreading across Latin America.
 2003 – Latin Kings: A Street Gang StoryLatin Kings, DCTV official website – The Latin Kings are New York's largest, most dangerous street gang.  For decades they were synonymous with drugs, guns, and murder.  In 1995 Antonio "King Tone" Fernandez became the leader of the Latin Kings.  He vowed to lead the Kings away from violence and crime.  The cops said it was a smoke screen.  This is his story.
 2004 – Dope Sick LoveDope Sick Love, DCTV official website – The story of two drug addicted young couples living on the streets of New York City.  With no music, and no narration, Dope Sick Love is cinema verite at its rawest and most pure form.  No film has ever taken the viewer this far, and this close, into a life of crime, drugs, and addiction.  Both couples in the film claim to be in love, but their relationships are at the mercy of drugs, and the lifestyle that addiction demands.  All attempts to get clean end in failure, while the couples desperately try to hold on to the only thing meaningful they have left on the streets – each other.
 2005 – Bullets in the Hood: A Bed-Stuy StoryBullets in the Hood, DCTV official website – A film produced by Bedford-Stuyvesant resident and DCTV student Terrence Fisher whose friend was shot by a police officer while he was in the process of producing a documentary about gun violence.
 2005 – The Last CowboyThe Last Cowboy, DCTV official site  – Shot in Porcupine, South Dakota over 24 years, The Last Cowboy is a remarkable slice of American history.  While 250 families leave their farms and ranches every week in the U.S., this documentary follows a young man, Vernon Sager, and watches him grow old as he fights to maintain a way of life and sees it fade away.
 2005 – Off to War (1–10)Off to War, DCTV official website - From the farms and fields of Arkansas to the deadly streets of Baghdad, Off to War tracks the citizen Soldiers of the Arkansas National Guard as they come face to face with the horrors of war.
 2005 – Siberian Adoption Story – Russia is only second to China for children adopted by American parents. The process is expensive and arduous. A personal chronicle about an American couple from Fort Myers, Florida, and others like them, who traveled to Russia to adopt their babies.
 2005 – Venezuela: Revolution in ProgressVenezuela, DCTV official website - About the recall election for President Hugo Chávez in Venezuela
 2006 – Baghdad ERBaghdad ER, DCTV official website  – Shows the lives of the 86th Combat Support Hospital in Baghdad, Iraq as they work to save the lives of U.S. soldiers and Iraqis, winner of four Emmy awards.
 2006 – India Journal – Nine American schoolgirls travel from the United States to the rural villages of India, where they meet Indian girls and discover the obstacles these girls encounter – including heavy workload and gender bias – in trying to stay in school.
 2007 – The Bridge – Egypt, USA is a documentary reality series co-produced with Common Ground Production, DCTV and Baraka Productions. The show follows two Americans and two Egyptians as they share their lives and their countries.
 2007 – The Russians are Coming!!!The Russians are Coming!!!, DCTV official website – To create communication and understanding, five of Russia's most talented television reporters hopped aboard the CyberCar – a 40-foot bus with a Times Square video wall its side.  From the hollowed hills of Kentucky to the horrors of Hurricane Katrina – from the beaches of Brooklyn to the bayous of Cajun country – the inquisitive Russians searched for the soul of America.  Concurrently, they shared slices of Siberian and Post-Soviet life through reports they played on the TV wall to crowds of Americans who gathered around the bus, eager to exchange ideas and experiences.
 2008 – Dirty Driving – Anderson, Indiana is a rusty manufacturing town way past its industrial prime that used to boast 33,000 General Motors jobs.  Now, the factories stand empty, and the stores are shuttered. Everyone who can is getting out.  What's left of the town gathers every Friday night at the Anderson Speedway.  Here, you'll find NASCAR at its fender-rubbing, bumper-bumping, tire-trashing rawest.  A DCTV / HBO Production.
 2008 – A Woman Among Boys: A Brooklyn Basketball Story – As the only woman coach of a boys team in New York City's toughest AA basketball division, Ruth Lovelace faces unique challenges, but “Coach Love” has built the Kangaroos into a powerhouse – with playoff appearances in every year of her tenure. Players on her teams work to overcome significant obstacles both on and off the court. Their neighborhood is one of the most dangerous in the city, and players battle homelessness and the stress of having a parent in jail, while battling for victory on the court. Love and her assistant coach Elmer Anderson know where the kids are coming from – and where they have the potential to go. Both were star athletes at Boys and Girls High, who used basketball skills to secure full-scholarships. They know that for their boys there is more at stake in basketball than the score of the game – scholarships are on the line. With intimate access to Love, Anderson and the team, “A Woman Among Boys” follows the Boys High Kangaroos through the 2007–2008 season as they battled archrival Lincoln High School for the top spot in NYC basketball.
  2009 – China's Unnatural Disaster: The Tears of Sichuan Province'' – this documentary from Jon Alpert and Matt O'Neill, which was nominated for an Academy Award, details the aftermath of the earthquake that struck China's Sichuan Province in 2008. The earthquake killed over 70,000 people, 10,000 of which were the province's children. Alpert and O'Neill's documentary uncovers the sorrow, pain and outrage of the bereaved families as they cope with their loss and demand answers of the government.
  2009 – "Section 60: Arlington National Cemetery"
  2010 – "WARTORN: 1861–2010"

References

External links
DCTV official site
DCTV's YouTube site

Recording studios in Manhattan
Culture of New York City
Mass media companies based in New York City
Film organizations in the United States